József Ficzkó or Fitzkó (Burgenland Croatian: Jožef Ficko) (15 March 1772 – 28 November 1843) was a Slovene Roman Catholic priest and writer. After becoming a priest in the village of Peresznye near the current Hungarian-Austrian border, he became one of the most important Burgenland Croatian writers of his time.

Biography
Ficzkó was born in Boreča (now Prekmurje, Slovenia), then part of Hungary, which became part of the Austrian Empire in 1804. His parents were Miklós Ficzkó and Ilona (Jelena) Ficzkó. He studied in Szombathely with the help of Miklós Küzmics, a Prekmurje Slovene writer, and was ordained in 1797.

From 1802 until his death, Ficzkó was the priest in the small village of Peresznye, near Kőszeg, in an area in western Hungary in which many Burgenland Croats lived. Here he learned the local dialect of Croatian and wrote books in Burgenland Croatian. Ficzkó was a significant writer working in the standard language of the Burgenland Croats. His style was known as the Baroque.

Ficzkó rejected Panslavism, Illyrism, the new Serbo-Croatian language, and Gaj's alphabet. Instead, he supported using a clear Burgenland Croatian language to be understood by the people of his region.

Works 
 A.B.C. knyisicze za diczu Horváczkoga naroda va Kralyesztvi Vugerszkom (Primer for Croatian Children in the Kingdom of Hungary)
 Kratak pregléd Sztaroga Zakona (A Short Overview of the Old Testament), 1824
 Kratak pregléd Novoga Zakona (A Short Overview of the New Testament), 1824
 Nova hizsa zlata (The New Golden House), 1829
 Razlaganye velikoga katekismusa (An Explanation of the Great Catechism), 1836
 Kratko razlaganye czrikveni czeremoniov (Explanation of Church Ceremonies), 1836
 Novo Marianszko Zvetye (The New Virgin's Flower), 1837
 Nova Vrata nebeszka (The New Heavenly Gate), 1864

Literature 
 Nikola Benčić: Književnost gradišćanskih Hrvata, Zagreb 1998.

See also
Catholic Church in Slovenia

References

External links 
 Siegfried Tornow: Burgenlandkroatisch

1772 births
1843 deaths
Burgenland Croats
Croatian writers
19th-century Croatian Roman Catholic priests
18th-century Hungarian Roman Catholic priests
19th-century Hungarian Roman Catholic priests
People from the Municipality of Gornji Petrovci